The pharyngeal plexus (venous) is a network of veins beginning in the pharyngeal (nerve) plexus on the outer surface of the pharynx, and, after receiving some posterior meningeal veins and the vein of the pterygoid canal, end in the internal jugular.

See also
 Pterygoid venous plexus

References

External links
 http://anatomy.uams.edu/AnatomyHTML/veins_head&neck.html

Veins